Jackson Mansion and Carriage House is a historic home and carriage house located at Berwick, Columbia County, Pennsylvania.  The mansion was built in 1877, and is three stories, with basement, surfaced with Vermont stone in a Second Empire / Italianate-style.  The front facade features a three-story central tower with a mansard roof and pedimented portico supported by Doric order 
columns.  The carriage house is a two-story, hipped roof building faced with Vermont stone.  The mansion once housed the Berwick City Hall and is now home of the Berwick Historical Society.

It was added to the National Register of Historic Places in 1985.

References

Houses on the National Register of Historic Places in Pennsylvania
Italianate architecture in Pennsylvania
Second Empire architecture in Pennsylvania
Houses completed in 1877
Houses in Columbia County, Pennsylvania
National Register of Historic Places in Columbia County, Pennsylvania
1877 establishments in Pennsylvania